Lynn Denholm (born 22 October 1939 in Melbourne, Australia) is a retired Australian cricket player.
Denholm played eight test matches for the Australia national women's cricket team.

References

1939 births
Australia women Test cricketers
Living people
People from Melbourne